Aruban Division di Honor or Campeonato AVB Aruba Bank is the top level association football league in Aruba.  It is overseen by the Arubaanse Voetbal Bond and was created in 1960.
Up to and including 1985, the top clubs from Aruba also entered the Kopa Antiano for the championship of the Netherlands Antilles, RCA and Estrella were the only Aruban teams to win that championship in 1965 and 1970.

The winner of the league starts the qualifications for the CONCACAF Champions Cup from the first round of the CFU Club Championship. The 10th-placed team is relegated to the Division Uno, while the 8th and the 9th-placed teams play a 4-team round-robin with the 2nd and the 3rd of the second level to decide the relegation from or the promotion to the Division di Honor.

The championship is usually played between April and November.

Campeonato AVB – Member clubs 2017–18

Britannia (Piedra Plat)
Bubali (Noord)
Caiquetio (Paradera)
Dakota (Dakota)
Nacional (Palm Beach)
Estrella (Santa Cruz)
Juventud TL (Tanki Leendert)
La Fama (Savaneta)
RCA (Solito)
River Plate (Madiki)

Previous winners

Performance by club

Best scorers

References

External links
Aruba – List of Champions, RSSSF.com
Official website
Division di Honor

 
1
Top level football leagues in the Caribbean
1960 establishments in Aruba
Sports leagues established in 1960